The 2019 World Short Track Speed Skating Championships were held in Sofia, Bulgaria from 8 to 10 March 2019.

Schedule
All times are local (UTC+2).

Medal summary

Medals table

Men

Women

References

External links
Results book

World Short Track Speed Skating Championships
World Short Track Speed Skating Championships
2019 in Bulgarian sport
International speed skating competitions hosted by Bulgaria
Sports competitions in Sofia
World Short Track
2010s in Sofia